Moran Station is the southern terminus of Seoul Subway Line 8. It is also a station on the Suin-Bundang Line. On the 4th and 9th day of the month, Moran Market is held near Moran Station.

Station layout

Bundang Line

Line 8

Vicinity
Exit 4: Jungwon-gu Office
Exit 5: Moran Market
Exit 9: Seongsu Elementary School
Exit 11: Pungsaeng Middle & High Schools

References

Metro stations in Seongnam
Seoul Metropolitan Subway stations
Railway stations opened in 1994